The Java Portlet Specification defines a contract between the portlet container and portlets and provides a convenient programming model for Java portlet developers.

Portlets are pluggable user interface software components that are managed and displayed in a web portal, for example an enterprise portal or a web CMS. A portlet can aggregate (integrate) and personalize content from different sources within a web page.  A  portlet responds to requests from a web client with and generates dynamic content.

Portlets produce fragments of markup (HTML, XHTML, WML) that are aggregated into a portal. Typically, following the desktop metaphor, a portal page is displayed as a collection of non-overlapping portlet windows, where each portlet window displays a portlet. Hence a portlet (or collection of portlets) resembles a web-based application that is hosted in a portal.

Some examples of portlet applications are e-mail, weather reports, discussion forums, and news.

A portlet is managed by a portlet container. Portlet standards platform independent application programming interfaces that are intended to enable software developers to create portlets that can be plugged into any portal supporting the standards. An example is the Java Portlet Specification. A Java portlet resembles a Java Servlet, but produces fragments rather than complete documents, and is not bound by a URL.

A portlet container runs portlets and provides them with the required runtime environment. A portlet container contains portlets and manages their life cycles. It also provides persistent storage mechanisms for the portlet preferences. A portlet container receives requests from the portal to execute requests on the portlets hosted by it. A portlet container is not responsible for aggregating the content produced by the portlets; the portal itself handles aggregation. A portal and a portlet container can be built together as a single component of an application suite or as two separate components of a portal application.

JSR 168 
The Java Portlet Specification V1.0 was developed under the Java Community Process as Java Specification Request JSR 168, and released in its final form in October 2003.

The Java Portlet Specification V1.0 introduces the basic portlet programming model with:
 two phases of action processing and rendering in order to support the Model–View–Controller pattern.
 portlet modes, enabling the portal to advise the portlet what task it should perform and what content it should generate
 window states, indicating the amount of portal page space that will be assigned to the content generated by the portlet
 portlet data model, allowing the portlet to store view information in the render parameters, session related information in the portlet session and per user persistent data in the portlet preferences
 a packaging format in order to group different portlets and other Java EE artifacts needed by these portlets into one portlet application which can be deployed on the portal server.
 Portal development as a way to integrate the different web-based applications for supporting deliveries of information and services.

Portlet Catalog
Initially Java portal vendors had their own portlet development framework thus those portlets were confined  to specific portal servers and couldn't be deployed to the rest of the Java portals. After JSR 168 inception, Java portlets may be deployed on any Java portal servers adhering to JSR 168 specifications.

A Portlets Catalog is a set of portlets that are ready-to-use components for enterprise portals. For those who want to adopt portals certainly need many and variety of portlets to deploy and run. Here Portlets catalog are of use.

A JSR 168 portlets catalog makes sure that portlets under this catalog may run on any standards–compliant Java portal server. Types of portlet solution (vertical domains and technology) like collaboration, social networking, community, content management, utility, calendaring, HRM all are available in these catalogs.

There are many open source and commercial Portlets Catalog available but JSR 168 based solutions are rare.

JSR 168 specifications offer suitability to the developers to reuse the code to maintain a set of JSR 168 compliant portlets. For deployers, it's easy to keep a single set of solution and deploy it on many.

JSR 286 

JSR-286 is the Java Portlet specification v2.0 as developed under the JCP and created in alignment with the updated version 2.0 of WSRP. It was released in June 2008.  It was developed to improve on the short-comings of the version 1.0 specification, JSR-168.  Some of its major features include:

 Inter-Portlet Communication through events and public render parameters
 Serving dynamically generated resources directly through portlets
 Serving AJAX or JSON data directly through portlets
 Introduction of portlet filters and listeners

JSR 362 

JSR-362 is the Java Portlet specification v3.0 and was released in April 2017. Some of its major features include:
 Resource Dependencies
 Explicit Render State
 CDI 1.2 Integration
 Servlet 3.1 Alignment
 Portlet Hub & XHR IPC
 FacesBridge Integration via JSR 378

See also
 List of enterprise portal vendors
 Web Services for Remote Portlets (WSRP)
 Java Portlet Specification
  JSR 168 (Java Portlet Definition Standard)

References

External links 

 JSR 168 (Version 1.0 of the Java Portlet Specification)
 JSR 286 (Version 2.0 of the Java Portlet Specification)
 JSR 362 (Version 3.0 of the Java Portlet specification)
 JSR 301 (Portlet 2.0 Bridge for JSF 1.2 Specification)
 JSR 329 (Portlet 2.0 Bridge for JSF 1.2 Specification)
 JSR 378 (Portlet 3.0 Bridge for JSF 2.2 Specification)
 JSR 168 Open Source Reference Implementation at Apache
 Open source JSR 168/WSRP community at https://web.archive.org/web/20100613131851/http://www.java.net/
 Rapid Portlet Generator for generating JSR 168-compliant portlets
 Dynamic SOAP Portlet, for dynamic integration of SOAP services in JSR-168 portals

Portlet specification
Portlet specification
Web portals
AMD 
AMD microprocessors  
AMD technologies